The Cambridge University Rugby Union Football Club, sometimes abbreviated "CURUFC", is the rugby union club of the University of Cambridge. The team plays Oxford University RFC in the annual Varsity Match at Twickenham Stadium every December.

Cambridge players wear light blue and white hooped jerseys with a red lion crest. Many have gone on to represent their country and the British and Irish Lions; a few, most notably Dan Vickerman, James Horwill & Flip van der Merwe, have represented Cambridge after successful international careers. While at Cambridge University James Bevan became the first captain of the Wales national rugby union team. The CURUFC stadium is located in West Cambridge, beside Grange Road.

History 

Football is believed to have been introduced to Cambridge University in 1839 by Trinity College fresher Albert Pell. Pell had matriculated at Cambridge after going up from Rugby School, where the game of rugby is believed to have originated. Cambridge University Rugby Union Football Club was officially established in 1872, around three years after the Oxford rugby club was founded. The first Varsity match was contested between the two teams on 10 February 1872. The Cambridge team was led out by captain Isaac Cowley Lambert, wearing pink jerseys with a monogram on the left breast. Played away at the Park in Oxford, Cambridge lost by a single goal to nil. CURUFC officials helped to draw up the laws of the game that were adopted by the Rugby Football Union (RFU) when it was established in 1871. Cambridge became a Constituent Body of the Union in 1872, a status which the club still holds today. In 1874, Cambridge provided their first international player directly from the club, when John Batten represented England in the third encounter against Scotland.

Facilities

Ground

The CURUFC Stadium and Training Grounds are located in West Cambridge, close to Selwyn College's Cripps Court and St Catharine's College's St Chad building. The historic stadium features a number of buildings dating to the early 19th and 20th centuries. A large red lion, a symbol of the University of Cambridge and the crest of the rugby club, stands guard beside the stadium.  The lion statue was removed in 1999 from the Lion Yard shopping arcade. The facilities are partially maintained by Cantab Asset Management. The stadium, built in the 19th century, is undersized and is often over capacity during matches, leading to calls for an expansion and redevelopment project. In addition to the Grange Road Site, the club practises on various college and university fields around Cambridge and Grantchester.

Redevelopment Project
In 2015, plans were drafted for a large redevelopment of the Grange Road Site which would ensure the team remains competitive over the next 50 years. The plans included expanded seating, high-tech training facilities, and a new walled admission entrance on Grange Road. An architect for the project has yet to be chosen. In Michaelmas 2017, the CURUFC launched its first fundraising campaign for the Grange Road Redevelopment Project.

Notable former players

British and Irish Lions

The following former players were selected for the British and Irish Lions touring squads while playing for Cambridge University.

 Carl Aarvold 1930
 Randolph Aston 1891
 David Bedell-Sivright 1903, 1904
 Sydney Pyman Bell 1896
 J.H. Bordass 1924
 Harry Bowcott 1930
 Edward Bromet 1891
 William Cave 1903
 Owen Chadwick 1936
 Granville Coghlan 1927
 Mike Gibson 1966
 Thomas Alexander Gibson 1903
 Johnny Hammond 1891
 Alfred Hind 1903
 Herbert Laxon 1908
 Alun Lewis 1977
 Osbert Mackie 1896
 Edwin Mayfield 1891
 William Grant Mitchell 1891
 Arthur Rotherham 1891
 Clement Pearson Simpson 1891
 Ken Scotland 1959
 Arthur Smith 1955
 Aubone Surtees 1891
 Willie Thomas 1888
 Robert Thompson 1891
 William Henry Thorman 1891
 G. H. Waddell 1959
 William Wotherspoon 1891

Scotland internationalists

The following former Cambridge University players have represented Scotland at full international level.

  Joe Ansbro
  Andrew Balfour
  David Bedell-Sivright
  Mike Biggar
  David Brown
  John Argentine Campbell
  Ken Dalgleish
 
  Arthur Dorward
  Frank Fasson
  John Forrest
  Keith Geddes
  Cameron Glasgow
  Laurie Gloag
  Frederick Goodhue
  James Gowans
  James Greenlees
  Gavin Hastings
  Simon Holmes
  William Inglis
  Johnny Johnston
  William Lely
  Rab Bruce Lockhart
  Robert MacEwen
  Gregor MacGregor
  K. G. MacLeod
  Lewis MacLeod
  W. M. MacLeod
  Alfred Methuen
  Hugh Monteith
  Willie Neilson
  Eric Peters
  William Purves
  David Robertson
  Ian Robertson
  Ken Scotland
  John Scoular
  Arthur Smith
  Louis Stevenson
  Archibald Symington
  John Guthrie Tait
  Gordon Waddell
  Rob Wainwright
  Joseph Waters
  Frank Waters
  William Wotherspoon

Wales internationalists

The following former Cambridge University players have represented Wales at full international level.

  James Bevan
  Glyn Davies
  Cliff Jones
  Jamie Roberts
  Willie Thomas

England internationalists

The following former Cambridge University players have represented England at full international level.

  Rob Andrew
  John Batten
  Robert William Bell
  C.E. Chapman
  Huw Davies
  Edwin Field
  Toby Flood
  Herbert Fuller
  Barry Holmes
  Phil Horrocks-Taylor
  Cyril Lowe
  Charles Marriott
  R.M. Pattisson
  Samuel Victor Perry
  Marcus Rose
  C.H. Sample
  William Martin Scott
  Kevin Simms
  Peter Warfield
  Charles Plumpton Wilson

Ireland internationalists

The following former Cambridge University players have represented Ireland at full international level.

  John Robbie

Other nationalities

  Matthew Palamountain
  James Horwill
  Tom Lovelace
  Mick O'Callaghan
  Flip van der Merwe
  Dan Vickerman

Honours

 Melrose Sevens
 Champions (1): 1960

Bibliography

References

External links

 

 
Rugby clubs established in 1872
University and college rugby union clubs in England
English rugby union teams
Rugby union in Cambridgeshire